Abdulaziz Hatem Mohammed Abdullah (born 28 October 1990) is a Qatari professional footballer of Sudanese descent who plays as a midfielder for Al Rayyan and the Qatar national football team.

Club career
Hatem began his professional career with Al-Arabi SC in 2007 and moved to Al-Gharafa SC in 2015. In July 2019 he joined Al-Rayyan SC.

International career
He made his debut for the Qatar national football team during the 9th International Friendship Tournament held in December 2009.

Hatem participated for the Qatar olympic team in the 2012 Summer Olympic qualifiers. He received 2 yellow cards during the group stage, rendering him ineligible to compete for one game. Qatar, however, chose to play him against Oman, resulting in FIFA overturning the 1–1 draw to a 3–0 loss for Qatar. This meant that Qatar, who were undefeated in the group stage, would end up third in the group while Oman and South Korea went through to the next stage.

International goals
Scores and results list Qatar's goal tally first.

Honours
Al-Arabi
Sheikh Jassim Cup: 2008, 2010, 2011

Al-Gharafa
Qatari Stars Cup: 2017-18, 2018-19

Qatar
AFC Asian Cup: 2019
Arabian Gulf Cup: 2014
WAFF Championship: 2014

Individual
AFC Asian Cup Team of the Tournament: 2019

References

External links

Goalzz.com profile

1990 births
Living people
Qatari footballers
Qatari people of Sudanese descent
Sudanese emigrants to Qatar
Naturalised citizens of Qatar
Al-Arabi SC (Qatar) players
Al-Gharafa SC players
Al-Rayyan SC players
Qatar international footballers
Qatar Stars League players
2015 AFC Asian Cup players
2019 AFC Asian Cup players
2019 Copa América players
2021 CONCACAF Gold Cup players
Association football midfielders
Footballers at the 2010 Asian Games
AFC Asian Cup-winning players
Asian Games competitors for Qatar
2022 FIFA World Cup players
FIFA Century Club